"All Jacked Up" is a song co-written and recorded by American country music artist Gretchen Wilson.  It was released in August 2005 as the first single and title track from the album All Jacked Up.  On the U.S. Billboard Hot Country Songs chart dated for August 6, 2005, "All Jacked Up" debuted at number 21, setting a record for the highest ever debut by a female artist on the country charts. The last female artist to hold this record was Shania Twain, whose "I'm Gonna Getcha Good!" debuted at number 24 in 2002. Gretchen Wilson's record has since been broken by Carrie Underwood's "So Small", which debuted at number 20 on the Billboard country chart dated for August 18, 2007.  Wilson wrote this song with John Rich and Vicky McGehee.

Critical reception
Kevin John Coyne, reviewing the song for Country Universe, gave it a negative rating. He said that she was trying way too hard to recreate "Redneck Woman"

Music video
The music video premiered on July 29, 2005, and was co-directed by Wilson with Deaton-Flanigen The video features cameo appearances by Kid Rock, Hank Williams Jr., Charlie Daniels and Larry the Cable Guy, who appears as both himself and an angry transvestite.

Chart performance
The song debuted at #21 on the U.S. Billboard Hot Country Songs on the week ending August 6, 2005.

Year-end charts

References

2005 singles
2005 songs
Gretchen Wilson songs
Songs written by John Rich
Music videos directed by Deaton-Flanigen Productions
Songs written by Gretchen Wilson
Epic Records singles
Song recordings produced by John Rich
Song recordings produced by Mark Wright (record producer)
Songs written by Vicky McGehee